Marty Watkins (born 24 January 1962) is a British cross-country skier. He competed at the 1984 Winter Olympics and the 1988 Winter Olympics.

References

1962 births
Living people
British male cross-country skiers
Olympic cross-country skiers of Great Britain
Cross-country skiers at the 1984 Winter Olympics
Cross-country skiers at the 1988 Winter Olympics
People from Stroud